The LaPorte County Courthouse is a historic county courthouse in La Porte, Indiana, the county seat of LaPorte County. It was designed by Brentwood S. Tolan and built from 1892-1894. It is Richardsonian Romanesque architecture in style and was built with Lake Superior Red Sandstone. The building includes a tower with skylight, gargoyles and contains stained glass. It is listed on the National Register of Historic Places. The courthouse is part of the Downtown LaPorte Historic District.

See also
National Register of Historic Places listings in LaPorte County, Indiana
List of Indiana state historical markers in LaPorte County

References

External links

County courthouses in Indiana
Buildings and structures in LaPorte County, Indiana
Historic district contributing properties in Indiana
1892 establishments in Indiana
National Register of Historic Places in LaPorte County, Indiana